Ichocollo (possibly from Aymara jichu ichu, Peruvian feather grass, qullu mountain, "ichu mountain") is a mountain in the Andes of southern Peru which reaches a height of approximately . It is located in the Tacna Region, Candarave Province, Candarave District, and in the Tarata Province, Susapaya District. Ichocollo lies southwest of Chillihua.

References

Mountains of Tacna Region
Mountains of Peru